Holly Jane Kenyon (born 21 November 1980) is an English actress who won a scholarship to study at The American Musical and Dramatic Academy in central Hollywood. She appeared in The Kindness of Strangers (2010) and was invited to attend the film's screening at the 63rd Cannes Film Festival.

Early life

Holly Kenyon was born in Nottingham, Nottinghamshire, the only daughter of Jane Alison Kenyon. Both her maternal grandmother and grandfather were from Scottish families. She attended Trent College in Derbyshire before moving to Wales when she was 18 years old.  
Kenyon studied at university in Wales However she soon returned to her performing roots and auditioned for the American Musical and Dramatic Academy. She was immediately offered a scholarship and moved to Los Angeles to take up her place at the renowned drama school.

Personal life

Holly Kenyon lives in Carmarthenshire and has two sons, William and Sebastian Kenyon.

Career

Holly Kenyon began her career as a singer and was classically trained from the age of twelve. as well as playing the flute and 'cello. It had originally been her desire to pursue a career in musical theatre and she went on to work briefly in opera and pantomime and studied at the London College of Music. However, after studying acting at drama school in Hollywood, she decided to focus upon straight acting roles, once back in the UK. 
Shortly after returning from drama school, she won a place on an acting workshop that was held in Cardiff where she was spotted by a personnel management agent who offered to represent her. 
Soon after signing to her personal management agency, Kenyon was offered a supporting role in the British feature film The Kindness of Strangers. She played the role of a French bar waitress called Beatrice in the film. This film was screened at the 63rd Cannes Film Festival. The film starred David Prowse who played the role Darth Vader in the original Star Wars movies. In August 2010 it was announced that The Kindness of Strangers had earned six nominations at the International Filmmaker Festival of World Cinema including the nomination for Best Film of the Festival and a nomination for Best Director. The film eventually won four of the awards including Best Director for Hadfield. Prior to this film role, Kenyon also played a Russian girl in Perfidy, a role which required her to speak Russian. In 2011 Holly was cast as news reporter Celyn Bowen in the paranormal horror film Untitled.

Kenyon shot a sci-fi film in Birmingham. She played the lead role of Scarlet Davies in the futuristic sci-fi action film.

Filmography

References 

http://thekindnessofstrangersmovie.com/index.php?option=com_content&view=article&id=6&Itemid=2
https://web.archive.org/web/20110811112113/http://www.filmmakerfestival.com/noms2010.html
https://archive.today/20130505151835/http://www.thisisnottingham.co.uk/news/Holly-heads-Cannes-film-premiere/article-2172590-detail/article.html Lynette Pinchess 05-19-2010
http://www.rotundafilms.com/
http://www.imdb.com/name/nm0001190/
http://www.thisissouthwales.co.uk/news/Famous-festival-s-drama/article-2140249-detail/article.html
http://www.bbc.co.uk/news/10123382 Bruce Sinclair 5 November 2010
http://findarticles.com/p/news-articles/nottingham-evening-post/mi_8158/is_20100519/holly-love-films/ai_n53653541/?tag=content;col1 Nottingham Evening Post 05-19-2010
http://www.westerntelegraph.co.uk/news/8179957.Holly_reels_them_in_with_Cannes_debut/ Lee Day 05-21-2010
http://www.britfilms.com/britishfilms/catalogue/browse/?id=5B6B656A0ed2636B25KPi3649BB7
http://www.health-workforce.com/htm/b20061107.639797.htm 11 July 2006
http://www.newswales.co.uk/?section=Health&F=1&id=9727
http://www.actors.mandy.com/uk/actor/profile/holly-kenyon
 Lynette Pinches 10-22-2010
https://web.archive.org/web/20111006031221/http://www.filmmakerfestival.com/winners2010.html

External links

1980 births
Living people
People from Nottingham
English film actresses